Dragoje Jovašević is a Serbian former professional basketball player.

Playing career 
Jovašević played for a Belgrade-based team Crvena zvezda of the Yugoslav First League from 1973 to 1979. His teammates were Zoran Slavnić, Dragan Kapičić, Ljubodrag Simonović, Dragiša Vučinić, and Goran Rakočević among others. With them, he won a FIBA European Cup Winners' Cup in 1974 and a National Cup in 1975.

Career achievements 
 FIBA European Cup Winners' Cup winner: 1 (with Crvena zvezda: 1973–74).
 Yugoslav Cup winner: 1 (with Crvena zvezda: 1974–75).

See also 
 List of KK Crvena zvezda players with 100 games played

References

Living people
KK Crvena zvezda players
Serbian men's basketball players
Yugoslav men's basketball players
Year of birth missing (living people)
Place of birth missing (living people)